The Battle of Villa del Pilar took place during the Paraguayan war. Brazilian forces, under the command of then Colonel Rufino Eneias Gustavo Galvão, advanced on the village on September 20, 1867. About 250 Paraguayan soldiers resisted the attack, and Francisco Solano López ordered Colonel Felipe Toledo to send aid. There were 300 Brazilian casualties against 174 of the Paraguayans.

The Battle 

On September 20, 1867, Colonel Gustavo Galvão landed at the port of Villa del Pilar with 800 Brazilian soldiers. The landing was met by fierce resistance from the small garrison, made up of 250 men and women who lived in the city. Marshal López, aware of the Brazilian attack, sent his personal escort about 150 riders under the command of Colonel Felipe Toledo.

In a steam and three small boats in good condition landed reinforcements. The battle was quick, as the Brazilians did not wait for the Paraguayan riders, who found horses near the village. With hand-to-hand combat and the use of melee weapons, the Guarani inflicted defeat on the imperials, pushing them back to port.

Despite the Paraguayan victory, the Brazilians did great damage to the garrison, capturing close to 200 heads of cattle and supplies from the village, in addition to 60,000 cartridges and other valuable weapons and ammunition for the Paraguayan war effort.

The village was abandoned on 27 October 1867, giving a small clash of skirmishes. It was occupied the following day on October 28.

References 

Battles involving Paraguay
Battles of the Paraguayan War
History of Ñeembucú Department
September 1867 events
Battles involving Brazil